The Happy Puzzle Company is a retailer and manufacturer of "family puzzles and games", with "300 award-winning puzzles, games, challenges and puzzle books". The company is based in Elstree, Hertfordshire.

The company sells its products to the general public, supplies its own products to retailers and offers events. In an article in Times Education Supplement, The Happy Puzzle Company's school puzzle challenge days were described as "developing independent learning skills". The company offers a service aimed at working with children with dyslexia, dyspraxia and those who are gifted and talented, as well as offering programmes for businesses and charities.

Founded in 1992, the company won an award for Business of the Year in 2010. One of the company's products, "The Brain Train", won a 2018 Family Choice Award in the USA.

Jigsaw specialist company, mad4jigsaws is a part of The Happy Puzzle Company.

References

1992 establishments in England
Retail companies of the United Kingdom
Manufacturing companies of the United Kingdom
Companies based in Hertsmere
Toy companies of the United Kingdom
Game manufacturers
Puzzle manufacturers